Telegherry River, a perennial river of the Mid-Coast Council system, is located in the Mid North Coast and Upper Hunter regions of New South Wales, Australia.

Course and features
Telegherry River rises on the southeastern slopes of the Williams Range within the Great Dividing Range, below The Mountaineer, southwest of Gloucester, and flows generally south southeast and east, before reaching its confluence with the Karuah River north of Dungog. The river descends  over its  course.

See also

 Rivers of New South Wales
 List of rivers of New South Wales (L–Z)
 List of rivers of Australia

References

External links
 

Rivers of New South Wales
Mid-Coast Council
Rivers of the Hunter Region